The 2018 Allan Cup was the Canadian championship of senior ice hockey and the 110th year the Allan Cup was awarded.  The tournament played in Rosetown, Saskatchewan from April 9 to 14, 2018.  The Stoney Creek Generals defeated the Lacombe Generals 7–4 to win the national championship.

Information
Rosetown, Saskatchewan was named the host community in November 2016.

Notable players competing in this tournament include Ian White, Ryan O'Marra, and Lukas Sutter.

Participants
Rosetown Red Wings (Host)
20-2-0-2 record, 1st in ACHW
Defeated by Lacombe Generals 5-3 in league playoffs
Defeated Bethune AGT Bulldogs 3-games-to-1 to win Saskatchewan championship
Lacombe Generals (Pacific)
2009, 2013, and 2016 Allan Cup champions (as Bentley Generals)
18-4-0-2 record, 2nd in ACHW.
Defeated Stony Plain Eagles 7-1; defeated Rosetown Red Wings 5-3 to win league
Defeated Fort Saskatchewan Chiefs 4-games-to-0; defeated Stony Plain Eagles 4-games-to-1 to win Alberta championship
Automatically advance as British Columbia will not present a champion for McKenzie Cup
Bethune AGT Bulldogs (Saskatchewan)
Defeated by Rosetown Red Wings 3-games-to-1
Automatically advance as Rosetown is the host team
South East Prairie Thunder (Manitoba)
2012 and 2015 Allan Cup champions
Defeated Île-des-Chênes North Stars 3-games-to-0 to win Pattison Cup series.
Stoney Creek Generals (Ontario)
15-7-2 record, 1st in ACH
Defeated Dundas Real McCoys 4-games-to-0, defeated Whitby Dunlops 4-games-to-1 to win league.
Automatically advanced as Northwestern Ontario did not present a champion for Renwick Cup.
Elsipogtog Hawks (Atlantic)
7-5 record, 1st in NESHL
3-3 record, 2nd in playoff round robin; defeated Bouctouche Dodge Ram JCs 4-games-to-2 to win league
Automatically advance as no other Atlantic provinces will participate in this year's Allan Cup playoffs

Round robin

Full standings and statistics available at Pointstreak.com.

Results

Championship Round

Quarter and Semi-finals

Final

References

External links
Official Allan Cup Site 
Allen Cup Site at HockeyCanada.ca

2017–18 in Canadian ice hockey
Allan Cup
April 2018 sports events in Canada
2018 Allan Cup
2018
Allan Cup